was an official in the government of Japan's Okinawa Prefecture, and an Okinawan rights activist, in connection with the .

Life and career
Jahana Noboru was born in 1865 into a farming family in Kochinda magiri on Okinawa. In 1882, he traveled to Tokyo to study, one of five to be the first to be funded by Okinawa Prefecture to do so, attending Gakushūin and Tokyo University.　The first Okinawan university graduate, he was hired into the prefectural government as an engineer of agriculture and forestry. In this role, he set forth to revise various strict and oppressive agricultural policies, including regulations related to sugar production, and wrote a book on the matter, . However, he opposed the governor of the prefecture, Narahara Shigeru, on various aspects of policies related to the sales of public land and the bringing of new land under cultivation, and resigned from employment at the prefectural office.

Returning to Tokyo, Jahana joined with Tōyama Kyūzō and gathered together other commoners of a like mind, forming the "Okinawa Club" and beginning a suffrage movement. He published a treatise on his positions entitled . The movement was opposed by the governor, prefectural government, and various former officials, who strongly pressured the organization, and eventually forced it to break up. This setback drove Jahana mad, and he died at age 44.

References

1865 births
1908 deaths
People from Okinawa Island
Japanese activists
20th-century Ryukyuan people
19th-century Ryukyuan people